Kosmos 706 ( meaning Cosmos 706) was a Soviet US-K missile early warning satellite which was launched in 1975 as part of the Soviet military's Oko programme. The satellite was designed to identify missile launches using optical telescopes and infrared sensors.

Launch
Kosmos 706 was launched from Site 41/1 at Plesetsk Cosmodrome in the Russian SSR. A Molniya-M carrier rocket with a 2BL upper stage was used to perform the launch, which took place at 15:02 UTC on 30 January 1975. The launch successfully placed the satellite into a molniya orbit. It subsequently received its Kosmos designation, and the international designator 1975-007A. The United States Space Command assigned it the Satellite Catalog Number 7625.

See also

 1975 in spaceflight
 List of Kosmos satellites (501–750)
 List of Oko satellites
 List of R-7 launches (1975-1979)

References

Kosmos satellites
Oko
1975 in spaceflight
Spacecraft launched in 1975
Spacecraft launched by Molniya-M rockets